Lucy Johnson (born 2 November 1996) is an Australian soccer player who plays for the Newcastle Jets.

Early life

Johnson was born in Sydney, New South Wales and began playing football for Lindfield Football Club before moving to Tasmania at the age of 10.
Sister to Patrick, cousins with Kate, Amy, Zoe, Tommo, Livvi and Jack.

Club career

Johnson played in the Tasmanian Women's Super League before moving to Alamein FC and later South Melbourne in the National Premier Leagues Victoria Women. In Victoria Johnson established herself as an influential goalscorer despite her position in midfield as she scored 21 goals in 40 appearances across three seasons in the competition.

As a result of her form in the Victorian NPLW Johnson was signed by Newcastle Jets in the A-League Women ahead of the 2021-22 season. Johnson would become the first Tasmanian to represent the team.

Career statistics

References

1996 births
Newcastle Jets FC (A-League Women) players
Soccer players from Sydney
Living people
Women's association footballers not categorized by position
Australian women's soccer players